Lepyroniella is a genus of true bugs belonging to the family Aphrophoridae.

The species of this genus are found on the coasts of Black Sea.

Species
 Lepyroniella petrovi (Grigoriev, 1910)

References

External links

Aphrophoridae